Marco Buschmann (born 1 August 1977) is a German lawyer and politician of the Free Democratic Party (FDP) who has been serving as Federal Minister of Justice in Chancellor Olaf Scholz's  cabinet since 2021. He has served as a member of the Bundestag from the state of North Rhine-Westphalia from 2009 to 2013 and again since 2017.

Early life and career 

After graduating from the Max-Planck-Gymnasium in Gelsenkirchen in 1997, Buschmann studied law at the University of Bonn. In 2004, he passed his first state examination at the Düsseldorf Higher Regional Court. This was followed by a legal traineeship at the Regional Court in Essen and in 2007 the Second State Examination at the Higher Regional Court in Hamm. 

From 2007 until 2009, Buschmann worked as a lawyer at the Düsseldorf office of international law firm White & Case. In his free time, he was also a SoundCloud artist under the pseudonym MBSounds.

Political career 
Buschmann has been a member of the FDP since 1994.

In the 2009 Bundestag elections, Buschmann ran for election in the constituency of Gelsenkirchen and entered the Bundestag via list number 20. In parliament, he served on the Committee on Legal Affairs. He was chairman of the working group on legal affairs in the FDP parliamentary group and an expert on constitutional and economic law. From 2013, he succeeded Christian Ahrendt as the group's spokesperson on legal affairs. Due to the failure of his party to reach the five percent hurdle in the 2013 Bundestag elections, he left the Bundestag.

The federal executive committee of the FDP appointed Buschmann as Federal Executive Director with effect from 1 June 2014. Following his election to the German Bundestag, his term as Federal Executive Director ended on 31 October 2017. Marco Mendorf was appointed as his successor.

Member of the German Parliament, 2017–present 
In the 2017 federal elections, Buschmann stood for the FDP in the Gelsenkirchen constituency and was elected to the 19th German Bundestag via 4th place on the North Rhine-Westphalia state list of the FDP. In parliament, he was the chief whip of his parliamentary group, in this capacity supporting the group's chair Christian Lindner. In addition, he was a member of the Council of Elders, which – among other duties – determines daily legislative agenda items and assigns committee chairpersons based on party representation; the Committee on Legal Affairs and Consumer Protection; and the Committee on the Scrutiny of Elections, Immunity and the Rules of Procedure. He was also an alternate member of the Committee on the Election of Judges (Wahlausschuss), which is in charge of appointing judges to the Federal Constitutional Court of Germany.

Federal Minister of Justice, 2021–present 
In the negotiations to form a so-called traffic light coalition of the Social Democratic Party (SPD), the Green Party and the FDP following the 2021 German elections, Buschmann was part of his party's delegation in the leadership group, alongside Christian Lindner, Volker Wissing and Bettina Stark-Watzinger. Following the negotiations, the FDP entered the government as part of a coalition agreement, and Buschmann took office as Justice Minister in the Scholz cabinet.

Early in his tenure, Buschmann presented a draft law that would do away with a Nazi-era law forbidding doctors from providing information about abortions. Shortly after, he introduced legislation that would cut the red tape required for changing a person's name and gender, abolishing a controversial 1980 law regulating the process.

Other activities 
 Academy of European Law (ERA), Ex-Officio Member of the Governing Board (since 2021)
 German Forum for Crime Prevention (DFK), Ex-Officio Chair of the Board of Trustees (since 2021)
 Magnus Hirschfeld Foundation, Ex-Officio Chairman of the Board of Trustees (since 2021)
 International Bar Association (IBA), Member
 Amnesty International, Member
 Association of German Foundations, Member of the Parliamentary Advisory Board (2009-2013)

References

External links 

  
 Bundestag biography 

1977 births
Living people
Members of the Bundestag for North Rhine-Westphalia
Members of the Bundestag 2021–2025
Members of the Bundestag 2017–2021
Members of the Bundestag 2009–2013
Members of the Bundestag for the Free Democratic Party (Germany)
Justice ministers of Germany